Richland Creek is a stream in Iron County in the U.S. state of Missouri. It is a tributary of Big Creek.

Richland Creek was so named on account of their rich soil.

See also
List of rivers of Missouri

References

Rivers of Iron County, Missouri
Rivers of Missouri